Azhagi is a 1953 Indian Tamil language film directed by Sundar Rao Nadkarni. The film stars S. A. Natarajan and Krishnakumari. It was released on 13 December 1953.

Plot

Cast 
The following list was compiled from Film News Anandan's database.

S. A. Natarajan
Krishnakumari
M. N. Nambiar
Revathy
M. M. Mustapha
C. K. Saraswathi
V. K. Ramasamy
Rathnam

Soundtrack 
Music was composed by P. R. Mani while the lyrics were penned by K. D. Santhanam and Kanagasurabhi.

References

External links 

1950s Tamil-language films
Films directed by Sundar Rao Nadkarni
Jupiter Pictures films